Lars Adler (born 1976) is a German historian, archivist and phalerist. He has written two authoritative works on the orders of Baden.

References

Sources
 
 

Living people
20th-century German historians
21st-century German historians
German archivists
1976 births
Date of birth missing (living people)